112 Sea Cliff Avenue is a historic home located at Sea Cliff in Nassau County, New York.  It is a -story, irregularly shaped building dominated by a 3-story, octagonal tower with a tent roof in the Queen Anne style. The original section was built in 1884, and the eastern extension and tower added in 1887.  The main facade features a  projecting two-bay cross-gable with a jerkin head roof.

It was listed on the National Register of Historic Places in 1988.

References

Houses on the National Register of Historic Places in New York (state)
Queen Anne architecture in New York (state)
Houses completed in 1887
Houses in Nassau County, New York
National Register of Historic Places in Nassau County, New York
1884 establishments in New York (state)